Donegal Abbey (Irish: Mainistir Dhún na nGall) is a ruined Franciscan Priory in Donegal in Ireland. It was constructed by the O'Donnell dynasty in the fifteenth century. It is sometimes referred to as Donegal Friary.

It was built in 1474 on the orders of the leading Gaelic lord of the area, the ruler of Tyrconnell Hugh Roe O'Donnell, the First, and his wife Finola O'Brien.

In the Nine Years' War, the Abbey was used for a meeting between the rebel leadership and envoys of the Spanish King Philip II. The Abbey was the scene of fighting during the 1601 Siege of Donegal when a force led by Red Hugh O'Donnell attempted to capture the town from Crown forces led by the Gaelic warrior Niall Garve O'Donnell. During the fighting Niall Garve's younger brother Conn O'Donnell was killed.

Description
The abbey is located in the town of Donegal in County Donegal, Ireland. It is situated at the mouth of the River Eske, where it empties into Donegal Bay, to the west of the town centre.

History
Donegal Abbey was founded in 1474 by Finola O'Donnell (also known as Nuala O'Donnell), and her husband Hugh Roe O'Donnell. Finola was a member of a powerful family of princes in Leinster, while Hugh was the king of Tyrconnell, what is now County Donegal. The purpose of her journey was to request the founding of a Franciscan monastery in Tyrconnell. Her request was initially refused, but according to the account she replied: "What! I have journeyed a hundred miles to attain the object that has long been dearest to my heart, and will you now venture to deny my prayer? If you do, beware of God’s wrath, for I will appeal to His throne and charge you with the loss of all the souls which your reluctance may cause to perish in the territory of Tirconnell!". This plea was successful, and a number of Franciscans agreed to accompany her back to Tyrconnell. They began building the abbey, at a site next to the wharf in Donegal, which the account described as "a lovely spot, and sweetly suggestive of holy meditations".

Later in 1474, before the abbey was completed, Finola O'Donnell died. Hugh Roe married again, to Fingalla O'Brien, and she continued Finola's work, ensuring that the monastery, church cloisters and other features were completed successfully. The abbey was dedicated that same year. In 1505, Hugh Roe O'Donnell died and was succeeded by his son, Hugh Oge. Fingalla withdrew from public life after the accession of her son, living a life of austerity and prayer in a small house close to the abbey.

By 1601, the town of Donegal was under the control of the English crown, following an alliance made between Sir Hugh O'Donnell, a descendant of the original Hugh Roe, and the English as part of the Tudor conquest of Ireland., but the original condition of that was that his eldest son, Sir Donal O'Donnell by his first marriage would be the Sheriff of Donegal rather than an English captain. In this way, he kept the English out, while managing dynastic survival. Shortly after the Armada shipwreck of 1588, Sir Donal O'Donnell was knighted and appointed as Sheriff of Donegal by the Lord Deputy William FitzWilliam. Sir Donal was the leading contender in the O'Donnell succession dispute of the 1580s which took place while his father was still alive. His personal jurisdiction covered "that part of Tirconnell from the mountain westwards, i.e. from Barnesmore to the river Drowes (i.e. Tirhugh), and also all the inhabitants of Boylagh and Tir Boghaine (i.e. Bannagh)". Faced with the eclipse of her son Hugh Roe's position, Iníon Dubh acted usurpively. She had already burnt Donegal Castle, in war against her husband. Next she hired large numbers of Redshank mercenaries from her native Scotland to confront her son's rival. Sir Donal was defeated and killed at the Battle of Doire Leathan on 14 September 1590. Meanwhile, Sir Donal O'Donnell was survived by his only son, Donal Oge O'Donnell.  But Sir Hugh's son by his second marriage, Hugh Roe O'Donnell, the Second, was strongly anti-English and began rebel activity from an early age. He was captured twice by English forces, escaping both times, before seeking an alliance with Spain which led to the Nine Years' War. In Hugh Roe's absence, Tyrconnell was ruled by a rival, his cousin Niall Garve O'Donnell, who made terms with the English government and set up his base at the abbey. Hugh Roe attacked in 1601 to try to reclaim the territory, but was unable to do so. During the battle, on 10 August 1601, a fire broke out at the abbey which in turn ignited a store of gunpowder kept by Niall Garve. The resulting explosion destroyed most of the building and killed hundreds of Niall Garve's soldiers, including his brother Conn Oge O'Donnell.

The abbey was not rebuilt, and remains in ruins, but the Franciscan friars set up a new base at a refuge close to the River Drowes, near Ballyshannon. Members of the Donegal order such as Mícheál Ó Cléirigh, John Colgan, and Donatus Mooney played an important role during the early 1600s in recording Irish history.

References

Bibliography
 Lennon, Colm. Sixteenth Century Ireland. Gill and MacMillan, 1994.
 McGurk, John. Sir Henry Docwra, 1564-1631: Derry's Second Founder. Four Courts Press, 2006.
 
 
 Rowan, Alistair. North West Ulster: The Counties of Londonderry, Donegal, Fermanagh and Tyrone. Yale University Press, 1979.

Donegal (town)
Donegal
Christian monasteries established in the 15th century
Religious buildings and structures in County Donegal